Havardia is a genus of flowering plants in the family Fabaceae. It belongs to the mimosoid clade of the subfamily Caesalpinioideae.

Species
 Havardia albicans (Kunth) Britton & Rose
 Havardia campylacanthus (L.Rico & M.Sousa) Barneby & J.W.Grimes
 Havardia mexicana (Rose) Britton & Rose
 Havardia pallens (Benth.) Britton & Rose - Huajillo 
 Havardia sonorae (S.Watson) Britton & Rose

References

External links

 ITIS

 
Fabaceae genera